Bird Life is a book written by Australian ornithologist Ian Rowley and published by Collins (Australia) in 1975 as part of its Australian Naturalist Library series.  It was issued in octavo format (224 x 150 mm), containing 284 pages, bound in brown cloth with a dust jacket illustrated by a painting of a superb fairy-wren.  The book is illustrated with numerous photographs, drawings and diagrams and is dedicated by the author: “To my father Duncan Rowley who kindled my interest in birds”.

References

Notes

Sources
 
 

1975 non-fiction books
Ornithological literature
Books about Australian birds
William Collins, Sons books